Christian Cannuyer (born 17 December 1957) is a Belgian historian of religion, professor at the Lille Catholic University, a specialist in Coptic studies and a genealogist.

Career 
Christian Cannuyer teaches ancient Near Eastern religions, Christian church history, and Coptic language at the Theological Faculty of Lille Catholic University. He has published a number of books, including a volume on the Copts –  (1990, collection ""), which won the 1991 Eugène Goblet d'Alviella Prize in the History of Religions of the Royal Academy of Belgium; a lavishly illustrated pocket book for the collection "Découvertes Gallimard" –  (2000), which is only available in English and French.

Cannuyer is editor of the "" collection at Brepols, published in collaboration with the Centre Informatique et Bible of the Maredsous Abbey. He is the president of the  since 1994 and member of the Administrative Council of the Francophone Association of Coptic Studies. Since 2013, he is director of the magazine  in Brussels. In addition to Coptology and genealogy, Cannuyer also writes on the subject of Baháʼí Faith, and a secretary of the Marcel Thémont Association which, since 1990, has campaigned for the defense of the heritage of Brugelette.

Selected bibliography 
 Les Coptes, collection « Fils d'Abraham ». Éditions Brepols, 1990
 L'Égypte copte, les chrétiens du Nil, collection « Découvertes Gallimard » (nº 395), série Religions. Éditions Gallimard, 2000
 UK edition – Coptic Egypt: The Christians of the Nile, 'New Horizons' series. Thames & Hudson, 2001
 US edition – Coptic Egypt: The Christians of the Nile, "Abrams Discoveries" series. Harry N. Abrams, 2001
 Coptes du Nil : Entre les pharaons et l'Islam, ces chrétiens d'Égypte aujourd'hui, Éditions L'Archange Minotaure, 2007
 La girafe dans l'Égypte ancienne et le verbe  « sr », collection « Acta Orientalia Subsidia ». Éditions de la Société Belge d'Études Orientales, 2010
 Collective work
 AA.VV., L'Art copte en Égypte : 2000 ans de christianisme, « Livres d'Art ». Éditions Gallimard, 2000
 AA.VV., The Bible, its languages and its translations, Bayard, 2014

References

External links 
  

1957 births
Coptologists
Belgian historians of religion
Belgian writers in French
Living people